Lathrop Township may refer to the following places in the United States:

 Lathrop Township, Clinton County, Missouri
 Lathrop Township, Susquehanna County, Pennsylvania

See also 
 Lathrop (disambiguation)

Township name disambiguation pages